Daniel McMahon (February 16, 1890 – September 20, 1927) was an American sports shooter. He competed in the men's trap event at the 1912 Summer Olympics.

References

1890 births
1927 deaths
American male sport shooters
Olympic shooters of the United States
Shooters at the 1912 Summer Olympics
Sportspeople from New York City